Hein Thiha Zaw ( born 1 August 1995) is a footballer from Burma, and plays as a defender for Ayeyawady United.

On 13 April in an 2013 AFC Cup game against SHB Đà Nẵng Hein conceded a last minute penalty and was red carded in the last minute of the game. Nguyễn Minh Phương scored the penalty kick to wing the game 3–2. Hein's teammate Phyo Ko Ko Thein was also sent off minutes earlier in the same game.

Hein Thiha Zaw is known to have a poor disciplinary record, in his u-21 debut against Malaysia in 2013 he was also sent off in the first half.

In the 2015 AFC Cup group stage Hein sent off with a quarter of an hour to play against New Radiant S.C., in an eventual scoreless draw.

Hein Thiha Zaw made his senior debut in a friendly match against Hong Kong on 7 November 2015.

Honours

Club
Ayeyawady United
MFF Cup
Winners  (1):  2014
General Aung San Shield
Winners  (1): 2015

Shan United 
Myanmar National League
Winners (2): 2017, 2019
Runners-up (1): 2018
General Aung San Shield
Champions (1): 2017
Runners-up (1): 2019

References

External links
official facebook page

1995 births
Living people
Burmese footballers
Yadanarbon F.C. players
Ayeyawady United F.C. players
Shan United F.C. players
Myanmar international footballers
Association football fullbacks
Southeast Asian Games silver medalists for Myanmar
Southeast Asian Games medalists in football
Competitors at the 2017 Southeast Asian Games